La Pastèque is a French Canadian publisher of comics, based in Montréal, Québec.

Overview
La Pastèque ("The Watermelon" in English) was founded by Martin Brault and Frédéric Gauthier  in Montréal, Québec in July 1998, and their first publication, the first volume of Spoutnik, appeared that December.

The establishment publisher arose from talks between Brault and Gauthier about the state of comics in Québec around 1997.  Things seemed pessimistic, and it seemed unlikely that the small market in the province could sustain itself.  The two wanted to invigorate comics publishing in Québec, and chose to adopt a different approach to that of Franco-Belgian or American comics by publishing artists who had more personal work.  They are the main French-language publisher of a number of artists such as Michel Rabagliati, and have also revived older albums, such as Jean-Paul Eid's Jérôme Bigras and Réal Godbout & Pierre Fournier's Red Ketchup.

Recognition
La Pastèque has received support from the Canada Council for the Arts, the Société de Développement des Entreprises Culturelles ("Society for the Development of Cultural Enterprises") and the Government of Quebec's tax credit program for support of book publishers.  In 2010, La Pastèque won the Joe Shuster Award for Outstanding Publisher.

Published work
Red Ketchup
The Postman from Space

See also

Canadian comics
Québec comics
Culture of Québec

References

Quebec comics
Companies based in Montreal
Comic book publishing companies of Canada